Radohima is a mountain within the Albanian Alps in northern Albania.

Radohima rises between the Shala and Cem Valley. The massif of the Radohima has several other peaks with Maja e Radohimës at  being the highest peak of the massif. To the east, the mountain drops steeply over 1,500 metres into the valley of River Shala. The other peaks of the Radohima massif include Maja Tat , Maja Visens , Maja Reshkullit , and Maja Kuc .

See also 

 Albanian Alps
 Theth National Park
 Geography of Albania
 Mountains of Albania

References 

 

Albanian Alps
Mountains of Albania
International mountains of Europe
Geography of Kukës County
Two-thousanders of Albania